Espostoa frutescens is a plant in the family Cactaceae.

Description

Espostoa frutescens grows as a cactus. The species relies on nectar bats (including Geoffroy's tailless bat) for pollination. To facilitate the bats' echolocation, the plant's flowers are surrounded with a sound-absorbent furry area resulting in stronger flower echoes.

Distribution and habitat
Espostoa frutescens is endemic to Ecuador and confined to Loja, El Oro and Azuay provinces.

References

Trichocereeae
Cacti of South America
Endemic flora of Ecuador
Flora of the Andes
Near threatened flora of South America